Zinc finger protein 225 is a protein that in humans is encoded by the ZNF225 gene.

References

Further reading